Ranbhoomi is a 1991 Hindi-language action film, produced by Vijay Sinha under the V.K.S. Films banner and directed by Deepak Sareen. It stars Jeetendra, Rishi Kapoor, Shatrughan Sinha, Dimple Kapadia and Neelam, with music composed by Laxmikant–Pyarelal.

Plot
Village born, simple-minded and honest, Bholanath comes to the big city with five hundred rupees, which he decides to keep with a prostitute, as he feels that his money will be a lot safer with her, than with him. He then befriends a dreaded gangster, Roopa, and goes to live and keep house for him. In an attempt to end hostilities between Roopa and rival gangster, Chandan Singh, he then offers himself as a hostage. But will the dreaded Roopa compromise to save Bholanath? And if so, will Chandan let Bhola live?

Cast

Jeetendra as Chandan Singh
Shatrughan Sinha as Roopa Singh
Rishi Kapoor as Bholanath
Dimple Kapadia as Radha 
Neelam as Rani
Raza Murad as Sanket Singh 
Gulshan Grover as Bhangadh
Shekhar Suman as Dr. Paresh
Parijat as Rajni (Paresh Wife)
Annu Kapoor as Stationmaster
Anjan Srivastav as Havaldar Bindeshwar Dubey 
Ram Sethi as Pyarelal
Mangal Dhillon as Chandan's Henchman
Yunus Parvez as Mithalwala
Arun Bakshi as Hotel Owner
Amita Nangia as Kammo (Roopa's Sister)
Jagdish Raj as Police Officer
Vikas Anand as Saw Mill Owner
Kamaldeep as Grocery Shop Owner

Soundtrack

References

External links
 

1991 films
1990s Hindi-language films
Films scored by Laxmikant–Pyarelal
Films directed by Deepak Sareen